Shamli is one of the 403 constituencies of the Uttar Pradesh Legislative Assembly, India. It is a part of the Shamli district (prior to 2012, Shamli was a part of Muzaffarnagar district) and one of the five assembly constituencies in the Kairana Lok Sabha constituency. First assembly election in this assembly constituency was conducted in 2012 after the constituency came into existence in the year 2008 as a result of the "Delimitation of Parliamentary and Assembly Constituencies Order, 2008".

Wards / Areas

Extent of Assembly constituency is Shamli, Banat, Ailum and all other regions of Shamli Tehsil; Kandrawali, Aaldi, Kandhala, Gangeru of Kairana Tehsil; Nala, Taharpur Bhabisa, Kaniyan, Salfa & Sunna of Budhana Tehsil.

Members of the Legislative Assembly

Election results

2022

17th  Vidhan Sabha: 2017 Assembly Elections

16th  Vidhan Sabha: 2012 Assembly Elections

See also

Government of Uttar Pradesh
Kairana Lok Sabha constituency
List of Vidhan Sabha constituencies of Uttar Pradesh
Shamli district
Sixteenth Legislative Assembly of Uttar Pradesh
Uttar Pradesh Legislative Assembly
Uttar Pradesh

References

External links
 

Assembly constituencies of Uttar Pradesh
Shamli
Constituencies established in 2008
2008 establishments in Uttar Pradesh